Jermell Charlo vs. Brian Castaño was a unification professional boxing match contested between WBA (Super), WBC, IBF, and The Ring light middleweight champion, Jermell Charlo, and WBO light middleweight champion, Brian Castaño, with the winner set to become the first undisputed light middleweight champion since Winky Wright in 2004 and the first in the four-belt era. The bout took place on July 17, 2021 that ended in a split draw.

Background
After regaining his WBC title with a technical knockout victory against Tony Harrison in 2019, Charlo unified the light middleweight division with a knockout victory against WBA (Super) and IBF champion Jeison Rosario in 2020, picking up the vacant Ring magazine title in the process. Following the win, reigning WBO champion Patrick Teixeira expressed a desire to face Charlo in a fight for the undisputed championship. However, Teixeira had to fulfill his obligation to face the WBO's mandatory challenger, former WBA (Regular) champion, Brian Castaño.

In late 2019, after Teixeira was elevated from interim to full champion, the WBO designated Castaño as Teixeira's mandatory challenger. The pair faced off in February 2021, with Castaño emerging victorious via unanimous decision. Before the win, Castaño spoke of a potential matchup with Charlo, saying, "Teixeira is a great fighter. But when I win this fight, I want to fight with [Jermell] Charlo next. He's a great fighter, the fights with him pay good and he has three titles. After this, he is my next victim."

The fight was officially announced on April 15, 2021, and was televised live on Showtime.

The fight ended in a draw (tie) after twelve rounds, allowing both champions to retain their titles. A rematch was fought on May 15, 2022, when Charlo defeated Castano by a tenth round technical knockout to unify the championships.

Fight card

References

2021 in boxing
2021 in American sports
July 2021 sports events in the United States
Boxing in Texas
Sports competitions in San Antonio
Boxing matches